Paroxynoticeras is an extinct genus of lower Jurassic ammonite that lived during upper Sinemurian. Animals belonging to this genus had platyconic shells with compressed whorl section and could grow to large sizes. In the case of young specimens, umbilicum is small, but it increases in bigger specimens.. Last whorl is excentric, which can occur also in relative species, Paracymbites. While on the outer whorls, venter is always rounded, on inner whorls it can be both rounded or sharp. Ornamentation on inner whorls and suture is similar to Oxynoticeras, but in bigger specimens, ribs became straight, simple and blunt. In these bigger specimens, midlateral tubercules might be present.

Distribution
Fossils belonging to this genus were found in Europe, Tunisia and Morocco.

References

Oxynoticeratidae
Ammonitida genera
Jurassic ammonites of Europe
Ammonites of Africa
Sinemurian life